Ken Miller (born October 15, 1941) is currently an offensive consultant for the Montreal Alouettes of the Canadian Football League.  He previously served in the league as head coach and vice president of football operations for the Saskatchewan Roughriders. He served as the Roughriders head coach between 2008 and 2010, leading the team to appearances in the Grey Cup in 2009 and 2010. Miller returned as head coach of the Roughriders on August 19, 2011, after the firing of Greg Marshall after a 1–7 start to the 2011 CFL season. Miller was the club's offensive coordinator under head coach Kent Austin when they captured the 95th Grey Cup in 2007.  He had previously served on the coaching staffs of the Toronto Argonauts, University of Redlands, Dickinson State, and Yucaipa High School.

Coaching career
Miller started his coaching career in 1966 as a student assistant coach with Dickinson State. He spent the next three season coaching high school football in Oregon before becoming head coach at Yucaipa High School in 1970. He joined the University of Redlands as a part-time offensive line coach in 1977 and in 1984 he was promoted to the head coaching position.  In 1988 Miller was demoted to offensive coordinator. In 1994, Miller switched to defensive  coordinator. He moved back to the offensive side of the ball in 1995 and held the offensive coordinator position until his retirement after the 2000 football season. Miller was also the head baseball coach at Redlands from 1986 to 2000. As Redlands' baseball coach, Miller accumulated a 250–235–2 record and led the Bulldogs to a Southern California Intercollegiate Athletic Conference title in 1991.

In 2002, Miller started his Canadian Football League coaching career when he became the Toronto Argonauts quarterbacks coach. From 2003–2005, Miller was the Argo's offensive line coach. In 2004, Miller's offensive line helped the Argonauts win the 92nd Grey Cup and Damon Allen win the league's Most Outstanding Player award. In 2006 Miller was moved to the defensive side of the ball where he handled the defensive line.

In 2007, Miller was hired by former Argonauts assistant Kent Austin to become the offensive coordinator of the Saskatchewan Roughriders. Miller's offensive, led by MOP Kerry Joseph scored the second most points in the CFL and led the Riders to victory in the 95th Grey Cup. After the season, Miller was promoted to head coach when Austin left after one season to become the offensive co-ordinator at the University of Mississippi.  On December 2, 2010, Ken Miller resigned as head coach of the Saskatchewan Roughriders.  He was originally to remain vice-president of football operations. On August 19, 2011, Miller was reinstated as head coach after the firing of head coach Greg Marshall following the Saskatchewan Roughriders 1–7 start to the 2011 season. Following the second last week of the 2011 CFL season Ken Miller announced that he will be stepping down as the team's head coach and vice-president of football operations.

Head coaching record

College

CFL

Notes

References

1941 births
Living people
Dickinson State Blue Hawks football coaches
Redlands Bulldogs baseball coaches
Redlands Bulldogs football coaches
Saskatchewan Roughriders coaches
Toronto Argonauts coaches
High school football coaches in California
Dickinson State University alumni
People from The Dalles, Oregon
People from Yucaipa, California